The Kennebec Valley is a region of the U.S. state of Maine, consisting of the Somerset, Kennebec, and Androscoggin Counties. The area formed as a result of the Wisconsin Glaciation.

Notes

Regions of Maine
Geography of Androscoggin County, Maine
Geography of Kennebec County, Maine
Geography of Somerset County, Maine